The International Commission on Illumination (usually abbreviated CIE for its French name, Commission internationale de l'éclairage) is the international authority on light, illumination, colour, and colour spaces. It was established in 1913 as a successor to the Commission Internationale de Photométrie, which was founded in 1900, and is today based in Vienna, Austria.

Organization
The CIE has six active divisions, each of which establishes technical committees to carry out its program:

 Division 1: Vision and Colour
 Division 2: Physical Measurement of Light and Radiation
 Division 3: Interior Environment and Lighting Design
 Division 4: Transportation and Exterior Applications
 Division 6: Photobiology and Photochemistry
 Division 8: Image Technology

Two divisions are no longer active:

 Division 5: Exterior Lighting and Other Applications
 Division 7: General Aspects of Lighting

The President of the CIE from 2019 is Dr Peter Blattner from Switzerland.

CIE publishes Technical Reports (TRs), International Standards (ISs) and Technical Notes (TNs). International Standards (ISs) are often further developed as dual standards with the ISO or IEC.

Milestones
 In 1924 it established the standard photopic observer defined by the spectral luminous efficiency function V(λ), followed in 1951 by the standard scotopic observer defined by the function V’(λ).
 Building on the Optical Society of America's report on colorimetry in 1922, the CIE convened its eighth session in 1931, with the intention of establishing an international agreement on colorimetric specifications and updating the OSA's 1922 recommendations based on the developments during the past decade. The meeting, held in Cambridge, United Kingdom, concluded with the formalization of the CIE 1931 XYZ color space and definitions of the 1931 CIE 2° standard observer with the corresponding color matching functions, and standard illuminants A, B, and C.

 In 1964 the 10° CIE standard observer and its corresponding color matching functions as well as the new standard daylight illuminant D6500 were added, as well as a method for calculating daylight illuminants at correlated color temperatures other than 6500 kelvins.
 In 1976, the commission developed the CIELAB and CIELUV color spaces, which are widely used today.
 Based on CIELAB, color difference formulas CIEDE94 and CIEDE2000 were recommended in the corresponding years.

See also
 International Color Consortium
 International Colour Association
 International Electrotechnical Commission
 International Organization for Standardization

References

External links 
 CIE Web site
 Inter-Society Color Council

Lighting organizations
Color organizations
Members of the International Council for Science
Organisations based in Vienna
Scientific organisations based in Austria
Standards organisations in Austria
Vision
Members of the International Science Council